Polona Hercog was the defending champion, but chose not to participate.

Liudmila Samsonova won the title, defeating Katarina Zavatska in the final, 6–0, 6–2.

Seeds

Draw

Finals

Top half

Bottom half

External Links
 Main Draw

L'Open 35 de Saint-Malo – Singles
L'Open Emeraude Solaire de Saint-Malo
L'Open 35 de Saint-Malo